Queen's Park is an interchange station on the Watford DC line and Bakerloo line served by London Overground and London Underground respectively. It lies at the southern end of Salusbury Road, near the south-east corner of the public park from which the area now known as Queens Park has taken its modern name. The station is in Travelcard Zone 2.

History
The station was first opened by the London and North Western Railway (LNWR) on 2 June 1879, on the main line from London to Birmingham.

Services on the Bakerloo line were extended from Kilburn Park to Queen's Park on 11 February 1915. On 10 May 1915, Bakerloo services began to operate north of Queen's Park as far as Willesden Junction over the recently built Watford DC line tracks shared with the LNWR.

London Midland previously made three operational calls daily, which were not found in public timetables. As of the December 2013 timetable these stops no longer exist, with no main line services calling at the station.

Station layout
All platforms at Queen's Park station are on the surface, the station being covered by a glazed roof. The slow main line platforms (platforms 5 and 6) are reserved for use during engineering work or partial line closures. The two inner station tracks, platforms 3 (westbound) and 2 (eastbound), split into four tracks in a carriage shed to the west of the station. Bakerloo line services starting or ending at Queen's Park normally do so in the two centre tracks of the four-track carriage shed. Bakerloo line trains joining or leaving the London Overground tracks, also known as the Watford DC line tracks, do so by passing through the carriage shed on one of the two outer tracks, which merge into the Watford DC Line, the latter of which becomes the station's outer tracks. Around a third of Bakerloo line trains terminate at Queen's Park with others continuing onward to Harrow & Wealdstone.

All platforms are accessed by stairs and although there is local pressure for step-free access there are no firm plans for lifts or escalators to be installed. The stairs are all behind the ticket barriers.

Services
Queen's Park is served by a mixture of trains operated by London Overground London Underground on the Bakerloo line. The current off-peak service is:

London Underground (Bakerloo line)
 20 tph to Elephant & Castle
 3 tph to Stonebridge Park
 6 tph to Harrow & Wealdstone

11 tph from Elephant & Castle terminate at Queen's Park.

London Overground
 4 tph to 
 4 tph to

Connections
London Buses routes 6, 36, 187, 206, and 316 serve the station.

Future improvements
Great North Western Railway was given permission to run six trains per day from London to Blackpool North stopping at Queen's Park from 2018, but these plans have yet to come to fruition. 

Queen's Park may be the service's terminus, as stopping patterns including permission to run the service beyond Queen's Park to London Euston are dependent upon future infrastructural work to the West Coast Main Line.

References

External links

London Transport Museum Photographic Archive

Bakerloo line stations
Railway stations in the London Borough of Brent
DfT Category C2 stations
Tube stations in the London Borough of Brent
Former London and North Western Railway stations
Railway stations in Great Britain opened in 1879
Railway stations served by London Overground